David Martijn Westerholt (born 30 March 1979 in Waddinxveen, Netherlands) is the founder, keyboardist, and the main songwriter of the Dutch symphonic metal project Delain. He was previously a member of symphonic metal band Within Temptation, until he was diagnosed with infectious mononucleosis shortly after the release of Within Temptation's second full-length studio album, Mother Earth. His brother Robert Westerholt is the guitarist and founder of Within Temptation. He has lived in Zwolle, since studying Communication at Windesheim College in 1998. In September 2021, Westerholt formed a new symphonic project called Eye of Melian.

Discography

With Within Temptation

Studio albums
 Enter – 1997
 Mother Earth – 2000

EP
 The Dance – 1998

With Delain

Studio albums
 Lucidity – 2006
 April Rain – 2009
 We Are The Others – 2012
 The Human Contradiction – 2014
 Moonbathers – 2016
 Apocalypse & Chill – 2020
 Dark Waters – 2023

EPs and live albums
 Lunar Prelude – 2016
 A Decade of Delain: Live at Paradiso – 2017
 Hunter's Moon – 2019

Demos
 Amenity – 2002

With Eye of Melian

Studio albums
 Legends of Light – 2022

References

1979 births
Heavy metal keyboardists
Dutch heavy metal keyboardists
Dutch keyboardists
Living people
People from Zwolle
Within Temptation members
Delain members